The Royal Commission for inquiring into the condition of the poorer classes in Ireland was an initiative to investigate the causes of widespread destitution in Ireland at the beginning of the 19th century. The Commission conducted its extensive survey over three years, from 1833 until 1836, during which time it published various reports of its findings and recommendations.

According to its first report in 1835, the members initially appointed were:

 Richard Whately
 Daniel Murray
 Charles Vignoles
 Richard More O'Ferrall
 James Carlile
 Fenton Hort
 John Corrie
 James Naper
 William Battie-Wrightson

References

External links
 Index to reports of Irish Poor Law Commissioners, 1835-39 1845 633 pages
 Condition of the poorer classes in Ireland: first report: appendix A and supplement 1835 1218 pages
 Condition of the poorer classes in Ireland: second report  1836 17 pages
 The condition of the poorer classes in Ireland; third report 1836 592 pages
 The condition of the poorer classes in Ireland: Charitable institutions in the principal towns and Dublin report 1836 566 pages
 Condition of the poorer classes in Ireland: answers to queries put to magistrates 1836 191 pages
 Condition of the poorer classes in Ireland: appendix G: state of the Irish poor in Great Britain (Summary of) 2 pages
 Condition of the poorer classes in Ireland: remarks by G. C. Lewis on the third report (confidential) 1837 38 pages

Poor Law in Britain and Ireland
1830s in Ireland
Public inquiries in the United Kingdom
Social history of Ireland